What Our Lord Saw from the Cross is a c. 1890 watercolor painting by the French painter James Tissot. The work is unusual for its portrayal of the Crucifixion of Jesus from the perspective of Jesus on the cross, rather than featuring him at the center of the work. The scene shows witnesses, including Jesus' followers (the women and the disciple whom Jesus loved), participants, and bystanders; of Jesus' own body only the feet can be seen, at the bottom of the picture.

The painting is part of the series The Life of Jesus Christ, a series of 350 watercolors of events from the Gospels completed by Tissot. He prepared for these by extensive travels in the Middle East to study details of contemporary life, which he used in the paintings.  Prints were also published of the compositions. The whole watercolor series, completed between 1886 and 1894, was acquired in 1900 by the Brooklyn Museum in New York.

References

External links
 View from the Cross by Ronald Klip (artbible.info)

Paintings depicting the Crucifixion of Jesus
Paintings by James Tissot
Horses in art
Paintings depicting Mary Magdalene
Paintings of the Virgin Mary
Watercolor paintings